National Highway 353C commonly called NH353C, is a national highway in  India. It is a spur road of National Highway 53. It traverses the states of Maharashtra and Telangana in India.

Route 

 Maharashtra
Sakoli,
Lakhandur, Wadsa, Armori, Gadchiroli, Chamorshi, Ashti, Allapalli, Sironcha - Telangana.

 Telangana

Maharashtra - Parkal, Atmakur.

Junctions  

  Terminal near Sakoli
  near Desaiganj
  near Armori
  near Gadchiroli
  near Ashti
  near Allapalli
  near Sironcha
  Terminal near Atmakur

See also 

 List of National Highways in India
 List of National Highways in India by state

Notes 
 In first notification for S.N. 194A, route Sironcha to Atmakur was named as NH-363. This has been replaced as NH-353C with extended route from Sakoli.

References

External links 

 NH-353C on OpenStreetMap

National highways in India
National Highways in Maharashtra
National Highways in Telangana